Capua is a surname of Italian origin. Notable people with this surname include:

 Antonio Capua (1905–1966),  Italian politician
 Ilaria Capua (born 1966), Italian virologist and former politician
 Joe Capua, American basketball player
 Roberta Capua (born 1968),  Italian television host, actress and model 

Italian-language surnames
Italian toponymic surnames